Armend Kabashi (born 4 December 1995) is a Finnish professional football midfielder who plays for AC Oulu. He began his senior club career playing for Pallohonka, before making his league debut for Honka at age 18 in 2012.

Club career

Pallohonka

He made his first appearance on senior level on 5 May 2011 in the ranks of Pallohonka in a Kakkonen match against Sudet.

Honka

Kabashi made his professional debut on 6 April 2014 in a Veikkausliiga match for FC Honka against MYPA.

Eintracht Braunschweig II

In 2015, he joined the reserve side of German club Eintracht Braunschweig in the Regionalliga Nord.

Return to FC Honka
Kabashi returned to FC Honka in January 2018 and left the club again at the end of the year. However, he returned to the for the third time on 29 August 2019, signing a contract for the rest of the year with an option for one further year.

Gnistan
After a spell at KPV in the 2020 season, Kabashi moved to IF Gnistan on 21 April 2021, signing a deal for the rest of the year.

Oulu
On 29 January 2022, he signed with Oulu for the 2022 season.

International career

Kabashi was 18 years old on 5 September 2014 when he debuted in Finland national under-21 football team in a UEFA European Under-21 Championship qualification match against Wales.

Personal life
Kabashi is of Kosovo Albanian descent. His relatives Labinot Kabashi,  and Astrit Kabashi are also footballers.

Career statistics

Club

References

External links 

 
 Armend Kabashi profile at the website of the Football Association of Finland
 
 
 Armend Kabashi at sport.de

1995 births
Living people
Finnish footballers
Finnish expatriate footballers
Finnish people of Albanian descent
Finnish people of Kosovan descent
Finland under-21 international footballers
Association football midfielders
FC Honka players
Eintracht Braunschweig II players
FC Viikingit players
Pallohonka players
TuS Erndtebrück players
Kokkolan Palloveikot players
IF Gnistan players
AC Oulu players
Veikkausliiga players
Ykkönen players
Kakkonen players
Regionalliga players
Expatriate footballers in Germany
Finnish expatriate sportspeople in Germany